Trust is the willingness of one party (the trustor) to become vulnerable to another party (the trustee) on the presumption that the trustee will act in ways that benefit the trustor. In addition, the trustor does not have control over the actions of the trustee. Scholars distinguish between generalized trust (also known as social trust), which is the extension of trust to a relatively large circle of unfamiliar others, and particularized trust, which is contingent on a specific situation or a specific relationship.

As the trustor is uncertain about the outcome of the trustee's actions, the trustor can only develop and evaluate expectations. Such expectations are formed with a view to the motivations of the trustee, dependent on their characteristics, the situation, and their interaction. The uncertainty stems from the risk of failure or harm to the trustor if the trustee does not behave as desired.

In the social sciences, the subtleties of trust are a subject of ongoing research. In sociology and psychology, the degree to which one party trusts another is a measure of belief in the honesty, fairness, or benevolence of another party. The term "confidence" is more appropriate for a belief in the competence of the other party. A failure in trust may be forgiven more easily if it is interpreted as a failure of competence rather than a lack of benevolence or honesty. In economics, trust is often conceptualized as reliability in transactions. In all cases, trust is a heuristic decision rule, allowing the human to deal with complexities that would require unrealistic effort in rational reasoning.

Sociology

Sociology claims trust is one of several social constructs; an element of the social reality. Other constructs frequently discussed together with trust include control, confidence, risk, meaning and power. Trust is naturally attributable to relationships between social actors, both individuals and groups (social systems). Sociology is concerned with the position and role of trust in social systems. Interest in trust has grown significantly since the early eighties, from the early works of Luhmann, Barber and Giddens (see for a more detailed overview). This growth of interest in trust has been stimulated by ongoing changes in society, specifically known as late modernity and post-modernity.

Sviatoslav contended that society needs trust because it increasingly finds itself operating at the edge between confidence in what is known from everyday experience and contingency of new possibilities. Without trust, one should always consider all contingent possibilities, leading to paralysis by analysis. In this sense, trust acts as a decisional heuristic, allowing the decision maker to overcome bounded rationality and process what would otherwise be an excessively complex situation. Trust can be seen as a bet on one of many contingent futures, specifically, the one that appears to deliver the greatest benefits. Once the bet is decided (i.e. trust is granted), the trustor suspends his or her disbelief, and the possibility of a negative course of action is not considered at all. Hence trust acts as a reducing agent of social complexity, allowing for cooperation.

Sociology tends to focus on two distinct views: the macro view of social systems, and a micro view of individual social actors (where it borders with social psychology). Similarly, views on trust follow this dichotomy. On one side, the systemic role of trust can be discussed with a certain disregard to the psychological complexity underpinning individual trust. The behavioral approach to trust is usually assumed while actions of social actors are measurable, leading to statistical modelling of trust. This systemic approach can be contrasted with studies on social actors and their decision-making process, in anticipation that understanding of such a process will explain (and allow to model) the emergence of trust.

Sociology acknowledges that the contingency of the future creates dependency between social actors, and specifically that the trustor becomes dependent on the trustee. Trust is seen as one of the possible methods to resolve such a dependency, being an attractive alternative to control. Trust is specifically valuable if the trustee is much more powerful than the trustor, yet the trustor is under social obligation to support the trustee.

Modern information technologies have not only facilitated the transition towards a post-modern society, but have also challenged traditional views on trust. Information systems research has identified that individuals have evolved to trust in technology, demonstrated by two primary constructs. The first consists of human-like constructs including benevolence, honesty and competence, whilst the second employs system-like constructs such as usefulness, reliability and functionality. The discussion surrounding the relationship between information technologies and trust is still in progress as research remains in its infant stages.

Types 
Four types of social trust are recognized:
Generalized trust, or trust in strangers, is an important form of trust in modern society, involving a large amount of social interactions among strangers.
Out-group trust is the trust an individual has in members of a different group. This could be members of a different ethnic group, or citizens of a different country, for example.
In-group trust is that which is placed in members of one's own group.
Trust in neighbors considers the relationships between individuals who share a common residential environment.

Influence of ethnic diversity 
Several dozen studies have examined the impact of ethnic diversity on social trust. Research published in the Annual Review of Political Science concluded that there were three key debates on the subject:

 Why does ethnic diversity modestly reduce social trust? 
 Can contact reduce the negative association between ethnic diversity and social trust? 
 Is ethnic diversity a stand-in for social disadvantage?

The review's meta-analysis of 87 studies showed a consistent, though modest, negative relationship between ethnic diversity and social trust. Ethnic diversity has the strongest negative impact on neighbor trust, in-group trust, and generalized trust. It did not appear to have a significant impact on out-group trust. The limited size of the impact means apocalyptic claims about it are exaggerated.

Psychology

In psychology, trust is believing that the person who is trusted will do what is expected. According to the psychoanalyst Erik Erikson, development of basic trust is the first state of psychosocial development occurring, or failing, during the first two years of life. Success results in feelings of security and optimism, while failure leads towards an orientation of insecurity and mistrust possibly resulting in attachment disorders. A person's dispositional tendency to trust others can be considered a personality trait and as such is one of the strongest predictors of subjective well-being. Trust increases subjective well-being because it enhances the quality of one's interpersonal relationships; happy people are skilled at fostering good relationships.

Trust is integral to the idea of social influence: it is easier to influence or persuade someone who is trusting. The notion of trust is increasingly adopted to predict acceptance of behaviors by others, institutions (e.g. government agencies) and objects such as machines. Yet once again, perceptions of honesty, competence and value similarity (slightly similar to benevolence) are essential.

There are three different forms of trust commonly studied in psychology. Trust is being vulnerable to someone even when they are trustworthy. Trustworthiness are the characteristics or behaviors of one person that inspire positive expectations in another person. Trust propensity is the tendency to make oneself vulnerable to others in general. Research suggests that this general tendency can change over time in response to key life events. Once trust is lost, by obvious violation of one of these three determinants, it is very hard to regain. Thus there is clear asymmetry in the building versus destruction of trust.

Increasingly in recent times, research has been conducted regarding the notion of trust and its social implications:

 In her book, Barbara Misztal attempts to combine all notions of trust together. She describes three basic things that trust does in the lives of people: it makes social life predictable, it creates a sense of community, and it makes it easier for people to work together.
 In the context of sexual trust, Riki Robbins describes four stages. These consist of perfect trust, damaged trust, devastated trust and restored trust.
 In the context of information theory, Ed Gerck defines and contrasts trust with social functions such as power, surveillance, and accountability.
 From a social identity perspective, the propensity to trust strangers (see in-group favoritism) arises from the mutual knowledge of a shared group membership, stereotypes, or the need to maintain the group's positive distinctiveness.
Despite the centrality of trust to the positive functioning of humans and relationships, very little is known about how and why trust evolves, is maintained, and is destroyed.

One factor that enhances trust among humans is facial resemblance. Through digital manipulation of facial resemblance in a two-person sequential trust game, supporting evidence was found that having similar facial features (facial resemblance) enhanced trust in a subject's respective partner. Though facial resemblance was shown to increase trust, it also had the effect of decreased sexual desire in a particular partner. In a series of tests, digitally manipulated faces were presented to subjects to be evaluated for attractiveness within the context of a long-term or short-term relationship. The results showed that within the context of a short-term relationship, which is dependent on sexual desire, similar facial features caused a decrease in desire. Within the context of a long-term relationship, which is dependent on trust, similar facial features increased the attractiveness of an individual, leading one to believe that facial resemblance and trust have great effects on relationships.

Interpersonal trust literature suggests that trust-diagnostic situations provide a means by which individuals can gauge or alter the level of trust in relationships. Trust-diagnostic situations refer to in trust or "strain-test" situations which test partners' ability to act in the best interests of the other individual or the relationship, simultaneously rejecting that option which is in one's personal self-interest. Trust-diagnostic situations occur throughout the course of everyday life, though can be created by individuals wanting to test the current level of trust in a relationship.

Low trust relationships occur where individuals have little confidence their partner is truly concerned about them or the relationship. Those in low trust relationships tend to make distress-maintaining attributions whereby the consequences of partner's negative behavior become of greatest focus, and any impacts of positive actions are minimized. This feeds into the overarching notion that the individual's partner is disinterested in the relationship, and any positive acts are met with skepticism, leading to further negative outcomes.

Distrusting individuals may not always engage in opportunities for trusting relationships. Someone who was subject to an abusive childhood may have been deprived of any evidence that trust is warranted in future interpersonal relationships. An important key to treating sexual victimization of a child is the rebuilding of trust between parent and child. Failure for the adults to validate the sexual abuse contributes to the child's difficulty towards trusting self and others. Moreover, trust can often be affected by the erosion of a marriage. Children of divorce do not exhibit less trust in mothers, partners, spouses, friends, and associates than their peers of intact families. The impact of parental divorce is limited to trust in the father.

Importantly, trust may be placed in non-human agents in addition to human targets. For instance, people may trust in animals, in the scientific process, and in social machines. Trust helps create a social contract that allows humans and domestic animals to live together.  Trust in the scientific process is associated with increased trust in innovations such as biotechnology. When it comes to trust in social machines, people are more willing to trust intelligent machines with humanoid morphologies and female cues and when they are focused on tasks (versus socialization) and when they behave in morally good ways. More generally, they may be trusted as a function of the machine heuristic—the mental shortcut assuming that machines are less biased, more accurate, and more reliable than are humans such that people may sometimes trust a robot more than a human.

Humans have a natural disposition to trust and to judge trustworthiness of other individuals or groups of humans and things - in developing relationships with potential mentors worthy of trust for example, perhaps as part of interprofessional work in the referral pathway from an emergency department to a hospital ward, or as part of the process and work of building knowledge on whether the new practices, people, and things introduced into our lives are indeed accountable or worthy of investing confidence and trust in (as captured by the empirically grounded construct of 'Relational Integration' within Normalization Process Theory). This can be traced in neuroscience terms to the neurobiological structure and activity of a human brain. Some studies indicate that trust can be altered e.g. by the application of oxytocin.

Social identity approach
The social identity approach explains trust in strangers as a function of group-based stereotypes or in-group favoring behaviors based on salient group memberships. With regard to ingroup favoritism, people generally think well of strangers but expect better treatment from in-group members in comparison to out-group members. This greater expectation then translates into a higher propensity to trust an in-group rather than out-group member. It has been pointed out that it is only advantageous to form such expectations of an in-group stranger if they too know the group membership of the recipient.

There is considerable empirical activity related to the social identity approach. Allocator studies have frequently been employed to understand group-based trust in strangers. They may be operationalized as unilateral or bilateral relationships of exchange. General social categories such as university affiliation, course majors, and even ad-hoc groups have been used to distinguish between in-group and out-group members. In unilateral studies of trust, the participant is asked to choose between envelopes containing money that was previously allocated by an in-group or out-group member. They have no prior or future opportunities for interaction, simulating Brewer's notion that group membership was sufficient in bringing about group-based trust and hence cooperation. Participants could expect an amount ranging from nothing to the maximum value an allocator could give out. Bilateral studies of trust have employed an investment game devised by Berg and colleagues where individuals choose to give a portion or none of their money to another. Any amount given would be tripled and the receiver would then decide whether they would return the favor by giving money back to the sender. Trusting behavior on the part of the sender and the eventual trustworthiness of the receiver was exemplified through the giving of money.

Empirical research has demonstrated that when group membership is made salient and known to both parties, trust is granted more readily to in-group members than out-group members. This occurred even when the in-group stereotype was comparatively less positive than an out-group's (e.g. psychology versus nursing majors), in the absence of personal identity cues, and when participants had the option of a sure sum of money (i.e. in essence opting out of the need to trust a stranger). In contrast, when only the recipient was made aware of group membership, trust becomes reliant upon group stereotypes. The group with the more positive stereotype was trusted (e.g. one's university affiliation over another) even over that of the in-group (e.g. nursing over psychology majors). Another reason for in-groups favoring behaviors in trust could be attributed to the need to maintain in-group positive distinctiveness, particularly in the presence of social identity threat. Trust in out-group strangers increased when personal cues to identity were revealed.

Philosophy
Whilst many philosophers have written about different forms of trust, most would agree interpersonal trust is the foundation on which these forms can be modeled. For an act to be classed as an expression of trust, it must not betray the expectations of the trustee. In this sense, some philosophers such as Lagerspetz argue that trust is a kind of reliance, though not merely reliance. Gambetta argued it is the inherent belief that others generally have good intentions which is the foundation for our reliance on them. Philosophers such as Annette Baier have contended this view, establishing a difference between trust and reliance by saying that trust can be betrayed, whilst reliance can only be disappointed (Baier 1986, 235). Carolyn McLeod explains Baier's argument by giving the following examples: we can rely on our clock to give the time, but we do not feel betrayed when it breaks, thus, we cannot say that we trusted it; we are not trusting when we are suspicious of the other person, because this is in fact an expression of distrust (McLeod 2006). The violation of trust warrants this sense of betrayal. Thus, trust is different from reliance in the sense that a trustor accepts the risk of being betrayed.

Karen Jones proposed that there is an emotional aspect to trust, an element of optimism that the trustee will do the right thing by the trustor, also described as affective trust. Though, in some circumstances, we trust others even without the optimistic expectation, instead hoping the mere recognition that the person is being trusted in itself will prompt the favorable action. This is known as therapeutic trust and gives both the trustee a reason to be trustworthy, and the trustor a reason to believe they are trustworthy. In these situations, the sense of betrayal upon violation of trust is commonly warranted.

The definition of trust as a belief in something or a confident expectation about something eliminates the notion of risk, because it does not include whether the expectation or belief is favorable or unfavorable. For example, to have an expectation of a friend arriving to dinner late because she has habitually arrived late for the last fifteen years, is a confident expectation (whether or not we agree with her annoying late arrivals). The trust is not about what we wish for, but rather it is in the consistency of the data of our habits. As a result, there is no risk or sense of betrayal because the data now exists as collective knowledge. Faulkner contrasts such predictive trust with aforementioned affective trust, proposing predictive trust may only warrant disappointment as a consequence of an inaccurate prediction, not betrayal.

Economics

Trust in economics is treated as an explanation for a difference between actual human behavior and the one that can be explained by the individual desire to maximize one's utility. In economic terms, trust can provide an explanation of a difference between Nash equilibrium and the observed equilibrium. Such an approach can be applied to individuals as well as societies.

Trust is important to economists for many reasons. Taking the "Market for Lemons" transaction popularized by George Akerlof as an example, if a buyer of a car doesn't trust the seller to not sell a lemon, the transaction won't be entered into. The buyer won't enter into the transaction in the absence of trust, even if the product is of great value to the buyer. Trust can act as an economic lubricant, reducing the cost of transactions between parties, enabling new forms of cooperation and generally furthering business activities; employment and prosperity. This observation  created a significant interest in considering trust as a form of social capital and has led research into closer understanding of the process of creation and distribution of such capital. It has been claimed that a higher level of social trust is positively correlated with economic development. Even though the original concept of 'high trust' and 'low trust' societies may not necessarily hold, it has been widely accepted and demonstrated that social trust benefits the economy  and that a low level of trust inhibits economic growth. The absence of trust restricts growth in employment, wages and profits, thus reducing the overall welfare of society.

Theoretical economical modelling demonstrates that the optimum level of trust that a rational economic agent should exhibit in transactions is equal to the trustworthiness of the other party. Such a level of trust leads to an efficient market. Trusting less leads to the loss of economic opportunities, while trusting more leads to unnecessary vulnerabilities and potential exploitation. Economics is also interested in quantifying trust, usually in monetary terms. The level of correlation between an increase in profit margin or a decrease in transactional costs can be used as indicators of the economic value of trust.

Economic 'trust games' are popularly used to empirically quantify trust in relationships under laboratory conditions. There are several games and game-like scenarios related to trust that have been tried, with certain preferences to those that allow the estimation of confidence in monetary terms. Games of trust are designed in a way such that the Nash equilibrium differs from Pareto optimum so that no player alone can maximize his own utility by altering his selfish strategy without cooperation. Cooperating partners can also benefit. The classical version of the game of trust has been described as an abstracted investment game, using the scenario of an investor and a broker. The investor can invest a fraction of his money, and broker can return only part of his gains. If both players follow their economical best interest, the investor should never invest and the broker will never be able to repay anything. Thus the flow of money flow, its volume and character is attributable entirely to the existence of trust. The game can be played as a once-off, or repeatedly, with the same or different sets of players to distinguish between a general propensity to trust and trust within particular relationships. Several other variants of this game exist. Reversing rules lead to the game of distrust, pre-declarations can be used to establish intentions of players, while alterations to the distribution of gains can be used to manipulate perception of both players. The game can be also played by several players on the closed market, with or without information about reputation.

Other interesting games are e.g. binary-choice trust games, the gift-exchange game and various other forms of social games. Specifically games based on the Prisoner's Dilemma are popularly used to link trust with economic utility and demonstrate the rationality behind reciprocity.

The popularization of e-commerce opened the discussion of trust in economy to new challenges while at the same time elevating the importance of trust, and desire to understand customer decision to trust. For example, interpersonal relationships between buyers and sellers have been disintermediated by the technology, and consequentially required improvement. Websites can influence the buyer to trust the seller, regardless of the seller's actual trustworthiness (e.g.). Reputation-based systems improved on trust assessment by allowing to capture the collective perception of trustworthiness, generating significant interest in various models of reputation.

Management and organization science 
In management and organization science, trust is studied as a factor that can be managed and influenced by organizational actors. Scholars have paid particular attention to how trust develops across individual and organizational levels of analysis. They suggest a reciprocal process where organizational structures influence individuals’ trust and, at the same time, individuals’ trust manifests in organizational structures. Trust is also one of the conditions of an organizational culture that supports knowledge sharing. An organizational culture that supports knowledge sharing allows employees to feel secure and comfortable to share their knowledge, their work and their expertise. Structure often creates trust in a person that encourages them to feel comfortable and excel in the workplace; it makes an otherwise stressful environment manageable. By having a conveniently organized area to work on, concentration will increase as well as effort.

Management and organization science scholars have also paid attention to how trust is influenced by contracts and how trust interacts with formal mechanisms. Parallel to the very large interest in trust, scholars in management and related disciplines have made the case for the importance of distrust as a related but distinct construct.

Since the mid-1990s, a substantial body of organizational research has fallen into one of two distinct but nonexclusive paradigms of trust research. The first paradigm distinguishes between two major dimensions of trust. Trust in another can be characterized as cognition-based trust (i.e., based on rational calculation) and affect-based trust (i.e., based on emotional attachment). For example, trust in an auto repair shop could come in the form of an assessment of the capabilities of the shop to do a good job repairing one's car (cognition-based trust) or having a longstanding relationship with the shop's owner (affect-based trust). The second paradigm distinguishes between the trustworthiness factors that give rise to trust (i.e., one's perceived ability, benevolence, and integrity) and trust itself. Together, these paradigms are useful for predicting how different dimensions of trust form in organizations via the demonstration of various trustworthiness attributes.

Systems
In systems, a trusted component has a set of properties which another component can rely on. If A trusts B, a violation in those properties of B might compromise the correct operation of A. Observe that those properties of B trusted by A might not correspond quantitatively or qualitatively to B's actual properties. This occurs when the designer of the overall system does not take the relation into account. In consequence, trust should be placed to the extent of the component's trustworthiness. The trustworthiness of a component is thus, not surprisingly, defined by how well it secures a set of functional and non-functional properties, deriving from its architecture, construction, and environment, and evaluated as appropriate.

See also

References

Further reading
 Bachmann, Reinhard and Zaheer, Akbar (eds) (2006). Handbook of Trust Research. Cheltenham: Edward Elgar.
 Bicchieri, Cristina, Duffy, John and Tolle, Gil (2004). "Trust among strangers", Philosophy of Science 71: 1–34.
 Herreros, Francisco (2023). "The State and Trust". Annual Review of Political Science 26 (1)
 Marková, I., Linell, P & Gillespie, A. (2007). "Trust and distrust in society". In Marková, I. and Gillespie, A. (Eds.) Trust and distrust: Socio-cultural perspectives. Greenwich, CT: Information Age Publishing, Inc.
 Kelton, Kari; Fleischmann, Kenneth R. & Wallace, William A. (2008). "Trust in Digital Information". Journal of the American Society for Information Science and Technology, 59(3):363–374.
 Kini, A., & Choobineh, J. (January 1998). "Trust in electronic commerce: Definition and theoretical considerations". Paper presented at the Thirty-First Hawaii International Conference on System Sciences, Kohala Coast, HI.
 Gillespie, A. (2007). "The intersubjective dynamics of trust, distrust and manipulation". In Markova and Gillespie (Eds), Trust & Distrust: Socio-cultural Perspectives. Charlotte, NC: Info Age.
 Maister, David H., Green, Charles H. & Galford, Robert M. (2000). The Trusted Advisor. Free Press, New York
Schilke, Oliver; Reimann, Martin; Cook, Karen S. (2021). "Trust in Social Relations". Annual Review of Sociology. 47(1).

External links

 
 
 
 
 Trust Building Activities
 Trust: Making and Breaking Cooperative Relations, edited by Diego Gambetta
 Am I Trustworthy? (1950) Educational video clip
Stony Brook University weekly seminars on the issue of trust in the personal, religious, social, and scientific realms
World Database of Trust Harvey S. James, Jr., Ph.D. (Updated August 2007) A variety of definitions of trust are collected and listed.

Interpersonal relationships
Reputation management
Concepts in ethics
Accountability
Social constructionism
Social epistemology
Sociological terminology
Emotions
Moral psychology